Bonapartia pedaliota, the longray fangjaw, is a species of bristlemouth found in the Atlantic and Indian Oceans.  It is the only described species in its genus.  This species grows to a length of  SL.

References
 

Gonostomatidae
Fish described in 1896
Taxa named by Tarleton Hoffman Bean
Taxa named by George Brown Goode